Shut Up, It's Christmas is a promo-only EP released by Suddenly, Tammy! in 1995.

Track listing

 "There In My Head"
 "Linus and Lucy"
 "Plant The Halls"
 "Snowman"
 "Whole Lotta Girl"
 "Merry"
 "Rock'n'Roll Santa Claus"

Notes
"Plant The Halls" is an adaptation of the song "Plant Me" from the 1993 album Suddenly, Tammy!; singer Beth Sorrentino lays the lyrics of "Deck the Halls" over "Plant Me" instrumentation.
"Snowman" is a 1989 demo version, not the version that appears on (We Get There When We Do.).
"Whole Lotta Girl" is a 1993 demo version of a song later released on the album Comet.
"Merry" was later released on Comet.

1995 Christmas albums
1995 EPs
Christmas albums by American artists